Clairaut's theorem characterizes the surface gravity on a viscous rotating ellipsoid in hydrostatic equilibrium under the action of its gravitational field and centrifugal force.  It was published in 1743 by Alexis Claude Clairaut in a treatise which synthesized physical and geodetic evidence that the Earth is an oblate rotational ellipsoid. It was initially used to relate the gravity at any point on the Earth's surface to the position of that point, allowing the ellipticity of the Earth to be calculated from measurements of gravity at different latitudes.  Today it has been largely supplanted by the Somigliana equation.

History 
Although it had been known since antiquity that the Earth was spherical, by the 17th century evidence was accumulating that it was not a perfect sphere.   In 1672 Jean Richer found the first evidence that gravity was not constant over the Earth (as it would be if the Earth were a sphere); he took a pendulum clock to Cayenne, French Guiana and found that it lost  minutes per day compared to its rate at Paris.  This indicated the acceleration of gravity was less at Cayenne than at Paris.  Pendulum gravimeters began to be taken on voyages to remote parts of the world, and it was slowly discovered that gravity increases smoothly with increasing latitude, gravitational acceleration being about 0.5% greater at the poles than at the equator.

British physicist Isaac Newton explained this in his Principia Mathematica (1687) in which he outlined his theory and calculations on the shape of the Earth.  Newton theorized correctly that the Earth was not precisely a sphere but had an oblate ellipsoidal shape, slightly flattened at the poles due to the centrifugal force of its rotation.  Since the surface of the Earth is closer to its center at the poles than at the equator, gravity is stronger there.  Using geometric calculations, he gave a concrete argument as to the hypothetical ellipsoid shape of the Earth.

The goal of Principia was not to provide exact answers for natural phenomena, but to theorize potential solutions to these unresolved factors in science.  Newton pushed for scientists to look further into the unexplained variables. Two prominent researchers that he inspired were Alexis Clairaut and Pierre Louis Maupertuis. They both sought to prove the validity of Newton's theory on the shape of the Earth. In order to do so, they went on an expedition to Lapland in an attempt to accurately measure the meridian arc.  From such measurements they could calculate the eccentricity of the Earth, its degree of departure from a perfect sphere.   Clairaut confirmed that Newton's theory that the Earth was ellipsoidal was correct, but his calculations were in error, and wrote a letter to the Royal Society of London with his findings. The society published an article in Philosophical Transactions the following year in 1737 that revealed his discovery. Clairaut showed how Newton's equations were incorrect, and did not prove an ellipsoid shape to the Earth. However, he corrected problems with the theory, that in effect would prove Newton's theory correct. Clairaut believed that Newton had reasons for choosing the shape that he did, but he did not support it in Principia. Clairaut's article did not provide a valid equation to back up his argument as well. This created much controversy in the scientific community.

It was not until Clairaut wrote Théorie de la figure de la terre in 1743 that a proper answer was provided. In it, he promulgated what is more formally known today as Clairaut's theorem.

Formula
Clairaut's formula for the acceleration due to gravity g on the surface of a spheroid at latitude , was:

where  is the value of the acceleration of gravity at the equator, m the ratio of the centrifugal force to gravity at the equator, and f the flattening of a meridian section of the earth, defined as:

(where a = semimajor axis, b = semiminor axis).

Clairaut derived the formula under the assumption that the body was composed of concentric coaxial spheroidal layers of constant density. 
This work was subsequently pursued by Laplace, who relaxed the initial assumption that surfaces of equal density were spheroids.
Stokes showed in 1849 that the theorem applied to any law of density so long as the external surface is a spheroid of equilibrium. A history of the subject, and more detailed equations for g can be found in Khan.

The above expression for g has been supplanted by the Somigliana equation (after Carlo Somigliana).

Geodesy

The spheroidal shape of the Earth is the result of the interplay between gravity and centrifugal force caused by the Earth's rotation about its axis. In his Principia, Newton proposed the equilibrium shape of a homogeneous rotating Earth was a rotational ellipsoid with a flattening f given by 1/230.  As a result, gravity increases from the equator to the poles. By applying Clairaut's theorem, Laplace found from 15 gravity values that f = 1/330. A modern estimate is 1/298.25642. See Figure of the Earth for more detail.

For a detailed account of the construction of the reference Earth model of geodesy, see Chatfield.

References

Geodesy
Navigation
Surveying
Physics theorems
Gravimetry